La Cuisine au Beurre is a 1963 French comedy film starring Fernandel and Bourvil.

It was one of the most popular films of the year in France.

References

External links

La Cuisine au Beurre at BFI

1963 films
French comedy films
1960s French-language films
1960s French films